Paranoplium gracile is a species of beetle in the family Cerambycidae, the only species in the genus Paranoplium.

References

Xystrocerini
Monotypic beetle genera